René Binet may refer to:

René Binet (translator) (1732–1812), French translator
René Binet (neo-Fascist) (1913–1957), French political activist
 (1866–1911), French architect